Fort Thompson may refer to:
 Fort Thompson, South Dakota
 Fort Thompson, Columbia Department, which later became the City of Kamloops
Fort Thompson, Florida, a military post during the Second Seminole War along the Caloosahatchee River